Rachie, frequently sung to the hymn I Bob Un Sydd Ffyddlon, is a Welsh hymn tune. The music was composed by Caradog Roberts, with lyrics by Henry Lloyd, who is better known by his bardic name Ap Hefin. The lyrics are a call to battle, as can be seen with the English translation.

Composer 
The composer of the hymn tune was Dr Caradog Roberts (born in Rhosllannerchrugog, near Wrexham; 1878–1935) and the tune was named after Rachel Williams (married name Rachel Jenkins) of Resolven, near Neath. "Rachie" was composed in the first world war, and Roberts says that "The committee of the Resolven Music Festival requested me to write a new tune for the festival. I went at it straight away and wrote two tunes the same morning. I rejected tune No.1 and sent No.2. The following year the same committee sent me a similar request for a new tune and said how much they had enjoyed the tune I had sent them the previous year... I was extremely busy then and had no time to compose, so I looked up some old mss. [manuscripts] of mine and found "Rachie", the tune I had rejected the previous year. I sent it simply to oblige the friends at Resolven. "Rachie", notwithstanding the fact that it had been turned down by me, turned out to be the most popular of my tunes. It is named after the daughter – then a child – of the pastor of the Congregational Church at Resolven and is pronounced ‘Ray-chee’, which is short for ‘Rachel’."

Name 
The name of the tune derives from a visit in 1918 by Caradog Roberts to the Jerusalem Chapel in Resolven. This visit was to conduct a Cymanfa Ganu (a Welsh hymn singing festival) in a large chapel that seated 970 people. Caradog Roberts stayed with the minister of the chapel for that event.

The minister of the Jerusalem chapel was Parchedig (Rev) Robert Enoch Williams (often known as Rev. R.E. Williams), and minister of that chapel from 1902 to 1934. His daughter was popularly known as Rachie, although christened Rachel. ("Rachie" was pronounced by the family as "Ray-chee" and not as "Ratch-ee" which sometimes now occurs).

Dr Caradog Roberts introduced his new tune to the Cymanfa Ganu in Jerusalem Chapel (7 April 1918). Subsequently, he wrote to the Rev R.E. Williams and asked if he could name the tune after the minister’s 12-year-old daughter Rachie. Her father agreed. However, this new tune had a surprising origin. Dr Caradog Roberts wrote the above honest account about his hymn tune "Rachie" taken from a booklet of cuttings kept by Rachel Jenkins (Rachie) and now owned by her family.

Publication and usage 

"Rachie" was first published in 1921 in a Welsh Independents (Congregationalist) hymn book (Y Caniedydd Cynulleidfaol Newydd), which was co-edited by Roberts. The words sung in Welsh to "Rachie" are typically I Bob Un Sydd Ffyddlon, and were written by Henry Lloyd (1870-1946), who is better known by his bardic name Ap Hefin. The lyrics are a call to battle, this can also be seen in the English translation. The words express a similar call to arms as does the hymn "Onward, Christian Soldiers".

In 1931, the Salvation Army published the tune "Rachie" being sung to the words: "Hark! the sounds of singing, coming on the breeze. Notes of triumph winging, over lands and seas" (Charles Collier, 1915). The tune was published in The Salvation Army Tune Book for Congregational Singing. Later, the tune became the perfect accompaniment for the words of the hymn "Who is on the Lord's side?". This pairing was popularised in various hymn books from the 1960s onwards (e.g. Baptist Hymn Book, 1962; Hymns of Faith, 1964), sometimes transposed to the key of G major rather than the original A flat major.

The first recording of the tune "Rachie" appears to be on 23 June 1934 by the Salvation Army, recorded at a large Territorial Congress Salvation Army event at the Crystal Palace. The old 78rpm recording was one of the first to be made by a mobile recording van; previously all recordings being made in a studio. The 78rpm disc went on sale just three months later.

This first recording of "Rachie" started with the then General of the Salvation Army, General Edward Wiggins, who introduced the hymn, followed by a musical introduction from the united bands. The single microphone is suddenly moved around–first to record General Wiggins singing, then a soprano cornet, followed by the congregation singing.

The well-known male voice choir version of "Rachie" to the words I Bob Un Sydd Ffyddlon is an arrangement by Alwyn Humphreys (published by Curiad in North Wales in 1996) and has popularised an extra ending to "Rachie". This arrangement finishes with Haleliwia, Haleliwia, Moliant iddo byth, Amen (roughly translated as "Hallelujah, Hallelujah, Praise to him forever, Amen") that musically derives from the finale of the Welsh hymn tune: Mawlgan (J.H. Roberts, 1848–1924).

"Rachie" is used in hymn singing in places of worship and as an exuberant tune for choirs, congregations and organs.

Note: The opening chord of the tune "Rachie" does not follow the standard harmonisation of hymn tunes. Wyn Thomas, Senior Lecturer in Music at Bangor University, Wales (UK), comments as follows: "This tune is exceptional amongst Welsh hymn tunes, in that it begins with a tonic chord in its first inversion (i.e. a Ib chord or a I 6/3 chord). This is unheard of in the Welsh hymn tune repertoire because all other hymn tune composers establish the fundamental tonic (root-position) chord (i.e. chord Ia or I 5/3 chord) at the outset, with the tonic note in the bass part. Though Dr Caradog Roberts opens "Rachie" with a tonic chord, the 3rd of the chord appears in the bass part. This chordal arrangement gives rise to tonal ambiguity and can cause difficulty during unaccompanied performances."

See also 
 Resolven
 Cymanfa Ganu
 Rhosllannerchrugog#Musical heritage

Notes

References

External links
 Welsh Biography Online, Caradog Roberts
 Cymdeithas Hanes Resolfen History Society Jerusalem Chapel, Resolven
 Hymn words
 YouTube: Bob Un Sydd Ffyddlon is Morrison Orpheus Choir singing "Rachie" and the accompanying text contains, in full, the Welsh words of I Bob un sydd ffyddlon and an English language translation.
 Lyrics: "Who is on the Lord's side?"
 Lyrics: "Hark the Sounds of Singing"
 Welsh Biography Online, Henry Lloyd (bardic name: Ap Hefin)
 http://www.heilsarmeemuseum-basel.ch/E/salvation_army_records.php has some further details about the first Salvation Army recording of "Rachie" and a short excerpt from the 78rpm record
 A Tribute to Salvation Army Musicians, Music and Composers (scroll down and choosing MF238)

Hymn tunes
Welsh songs